Khandaker Abdul Mannan is a Bangladesh Freedom Party politician and the former Member of Parliament of Comilla-6.

Career
Mannan was elected to parliament from Comilla-6 in 1986. He contested the 1991 election as a Freedom Party candidate.

References

Bangladesh Freedom Party politicians
Living people
3rd Jatiya Sangsad members
Year of birth missing (living people)